Scooby-Doo! Mask of the Blue Falcon is a 2013 American animated superhero comedy film, and the nineteenth entry in the direct-to-video series of Scooby-Doo films. The film is a crossover, featuring Blue Falcon and Dynomutt. It was produced and completed in 2012, and released on February 26, 2013 by Warner Premiere.

Plot 
Scooby and Shaggy take the gang to a comic book convention in southern California called the "Mega Mondo Pop! Comic ConApalooza" to enter a costume contest as their favorite comic book superheroes, Blue Falcon and Dynomutt. Fred is eager to see the new and darker Blue Falcon film, produced by Jennifer Severin, starring Brad Adams as the new Blue Falcon. At the convention center, they meet Hank Prince, the owner of a comic book store Shaggy visits regularly, and his nephew, Austin. They also find the actor of the original Blue Falcon show, Owen Garrison. They eagerly approach Garrison to get his autograph, but instead they listen to their favorite celebrity ranting about how the studio is planning to remove all trace of the original Blue Falcon show for the new movie. While attending a screening for the movie's trailer, a monster that Shaggy and Scooby identify as Mr. Hyde, a villain from the original show, appears and unleashes a swarm of bats to terrorize the public. The gang offers to help investigate the situation.

The next day, the gang returns to the convention to wait for another Mr. Hyde attack, where they meet Jack Rabble, a former battle bots champion who makes a living signing autographs. Fred, Daphne, and Velma suspect Garrison is to blame, but Shaggy and Scooby refuse to believe their idol is the culprit. They then show the gang there are other suspects through surveillance footage taken around the convention. They show recordings of Severin boasting how the Mr. Hyde incident has increased publicity for her movie and Adams talking about how he dislikes his role and hopes that the incident will draw the public’s attention away from him so he can quit. They also learn from Austin that the Mr. Hyde attacks are based on original Blue Falcon episodes he was featured in and that he uses green ooze that turns people into monsters in his next appearance. Scooby and Shaggy flee into the storage rooms, where they find Mr. Hyde’s secret lair. Mr. Hyde himself chases them onto a big Frankenstein Jr. balloon, which he uses to fly across San De Pedro and unleash his ooze on the entire town and city hall; hitting Scooby, Shaggy, and the mayor. Angered and humiliated by this assault, the mayor fires the gang.

Later on, they learn from a news report that the movie's premiere will now be held at the baseball stadium. The gang heads back to the convention center, where Austin manages to acquire entry for them. With Rabble’s help, Fred, Velma, and Daphne find Mr. Hyde’s hideout and discover that he has surveillance cameras spread around the convention center and baseball stadium. From there, they see a giant Mr. Hyde rampaging in the latter. Meanwhile, seeking something to eat, Scooby and Shaggy see people fleeing from the stadium, causing them to run inside and find the giant Mr. Hyde chasing Austin. Scooby regains his superhero mentality and rushes to confront Mr. Hyde. He and Shaggy manage to rescue Austin, but Mr. Hyde kicks them out. Fred, Velma and Daphne arrive and manage to bring down the giant Hyde, which they discover was a giant robot seemingly piloted by Garrison. They believe he was Mr. Hyde all along, but the actor claims someone knocked him out and placed him inside the robot. Scooby and Shaggy witness the real Mr. Hyde stealing an armored vehicle. Scooby pursues Mr. Hyde and causes the vehicle to crash into the robot. Mr. Hyde unleashes his Hideous Hyde Hound on Scooby, but Garrison dons his original Blue Falcon uniform, saves Scooby, destroys the hound using the Falcon Car, and stops Mr. Hyde from escaping.

The gang unmasks Mr. Hyde, who turns out to be Rabble. He explains he was kicked out of the RC combat league when one of his robots went haywire and destroyed the arena. After being forced into an autograph career, he plotted revenge. He became Mr. Hyde to attack the convention and force the movie premiere into the stadium before knocking Garrison unconscious and putting him in the Hyde robot to frame him in the stadium attack. The attack would force the truck to take a detour, allowing him to steal the convention's $5,000,000 entrance fees. Impressed by the action following Rabble's arrest, Severin makes a sequel to the Blue Falcon film, with Garrison as the father of Adams' Blue Falcon and Scooby as Dynomutt.

Voice cast 
 Frank Welker as Scooby-Doo, Fred Jones and Dynomutt
 Matthew Lillard as Shaggy Rogers
 Mindy Cohn as Velma Dinkley
 Grey DeLisle as Daphne Blake
 Jeff Bennett as Owen Garrison/Blue Falcon
 Diedrich Bader as Brad Adams/Blue Falcon II
 Dee Bradley Baker as Hideous Hyde Hound, Horten McGuggenheim/Manic Minotaur of Mainsley Manor
 Gregg Berger as Hank Prince/Zorak
 John DiMaggio as Mr. Hyde
 Nika Futterman as Jennifer Severin
 Kevin Michael Richardson as Mayor Ron Starlin
 Mindy Sterling as Caterer
 Tara Strong as Austin, Nora Bingleton (credited as "Princess Garogflotach")
 Fred Tatasciore as Jack Rabble and Dynomutt II
 Billy West as James Becker

References

External links 
 

2010s American animated films
2010s children's animated films
2010s English-language films
2013 animated films
2013 direct-to-video films
2013 films
American children's animated comedy films
American children's animated mystery films
Animated crossover films
Films directed by Michael Goguen
Scooby-Doo direct-to-video animated films
Warner Bros. direct-to-video animated films